Eugenia crenata is a species of plant in the family Myrtaceae. It is endemic to Jamaica.  It is threatened by habitat loss.

References

crenata
Vulnerable plants
Endemic flora of Jamaica
Taxonomy articles created by Polbot